Charles Rosenfelder is a former American football player. He played at the guard position for the Tennessee Volunteers football team from 1966 to 1968. He was an All-Southeastern Conference player in 1967 and 1968 and a consensus first-team selection on the 1968 College Football All-America Team.

References

All-American college football players
Tennessee Volunteers football players
American football guards